"Broadway Blues" is a jazz/blues composition which has become a standard, composed by Ornette Coleman. It was composed in the key of E-flat major. "Broadway Blues" has been cited as a key work in the "Free Jazz" movement which began in the 1960s, a "vehicle" of Coleman's that "offered a freer approach to improvisation than had been used in earlier jazz styles".

References

Jazz compositions in E-flat major
Year of song missing